High Rock Lake is a lake in the U.S. state of Nevada.

High Rock Lake was so named on account of a tall rock formation at its shore.

References

Lakes of Humboldt County, Nevada